James Charles Hamon (born 1 July 1995) is a Guernsey-born footballer who plays as a goalkeeper for Truro City. He had previously played in the Football League for Exeter City.

Career
Born in Guernsey, Hamon was fast-tracked from Guernsey FA's youth setup to St. Martins, where he made his first-team debuts in 2011, aged only 16; he subsequently moved to Guernsey F.C. in the summer, but was mainly a backup to veteran Chris Tardif. He previously had trials at Southampton.

Hamon was invited to a trial at Exeter City in April 2013, signing a deal with the club in September, being assigned number 33. He renewed his link with the Grecians on 30 June 2014.

Hamon played his first match as a professional on 7 October, starting in a 1–3 away loss against Coventry City, for the season's Football League Trophy. He made his League Two debut on 22 November, starting in a 3–2 home win against Shrewsbury Town. He contested the starting goalkeeper place with fellow 19-year-old Christy Pym over the season, finishing with 21 appearances to the latter's 25.

Before the 2015–16 season, Exeter manager Paul Tisdale signed Austrian goalkeeper Bobby Olejnik, who became the regular first-choice goalkeeper at the expense of both Hamon and Pym. On 25 February 2016, Hamon was loaned to Hayes & Yeading United of the National League South for a month. It was later extended for the rest of the season.

Pym later moved back into contention, and made the starting position his own after Olejnik's release in June 2017. On 5 January 2018, Hamon joined Gloucester City, also of the sixth tier, on a three-month loan. He was released by Exeter at the end of the 2018–19 season. 

On 30 July 2019, he signed a 12-month contract with Truro City. 

On 21 January 2021, Hamon joined National League side Torquay United on a one-month loan deal. On 22 February 2021, the loan was extended for a further month.

Career statistics

References

External links

 
 
 James Hamon at ExeterCityFC.co.uk

1995 births
Living people
Guernsey footballers
Association football goalkeepers
Guernsey F.C. players
Exeter City F.C. players
English Football League players
National League (English football) players
Isthmian League players
Hayes & Yeading United F.C. players
Gloucester City A.F.C. players
Torquay United F.C. players
Truro City F.C. players